Suttharathnesvarar Temple, Uttathur, is a Siva temple in Uttathur near Siruganur in Lalgudi in Trichy District in Tamil Nadu (India).

Vaippu Sthalam
It is one of the shrines of the Vaippu Sthalams sung by Tamil Saivite Nayanar Appar.

Presiding deity
The presiding deity is known as Suttharathnesvarar . His consort is known as Akilandeswari.

Speciality
During the Tamil month of Masi on 12th, 13th and 14th days the rays of Sun falls on the presiding deity

References

External links
 மூவர் தேவார வைப்புத்தலங்கள், URRaththUr, Sl.No.43 of 139 temples
 Shiva Temples, தேவார வைப்புத்தலங்கள், ஊற்றத்தூர், Sl.No.24 of 133 temples, page1

Hindu temples in Tiruchirappalli district